The Scaife Mountains is a group of mountains rising west of Prehn Peninsula and between the Ketchum and Ueda glaciers, in Palmer Land, at the base of Antarctic Peninsula.

Discovered by the Ronne Antarctic Research Expedition (RARE) under Finn Ronne, 1947–48, who named these mountains for Alan M. Scaife of Pittsburgh, Pennsylvania, a contributor to the expedition.

List of mountains 
 Mount Brundage is a mountain located 12 nautical miles (22 km) west-southwest of Mount Terwileger in the south part of the Scaife Mountains. Discovered by RARE who named it for Burr Brundage, United States Department of State, who assisted in making arrangements for the expedition.
Discovered by RARE, and mapped by the United States Geological Survey from surveys and U.S. Navy air photos, 1961–67. The mountain was named by the Advisory Committee on Antarctic Names (US-ACAN) for Francis B. Macnowski, a construction mechanic at South Pole Station in 1967.
 Mount Terwileger is a mountain on the northern side of Ueda Glacier, standing at the SE extremity of the Scaife Mountains. Mapped by U.S. Geological Survey (USGS) from surveys and U.S. Navy air photos, 1961–67. Named by US-ACAN for Stephen E. Terwileger, hospital corpsman at South Pole Station in 1967.

References

Mountain ranges of Palmer Land